Bermudez or Bermúdez may refer to:

People 
 Bermudez (surname)

Places 
 Bermúdez Municipality, in the eastern Venezuelan state of Sucre
Capitán Bermúdez, a city in the province of Santa Fe, Argentina
Estadio Jesús Bermúdez, a multi-purpose stadium in Oruro, Bolivia

Businesses 
 Bermúdez Scholar Foundation, an educational non-profit organization founded in the United States
 Bermudez Biscuit Company, a Trinidadian biscuit fabric

Arts and entertainment
 Bermúdez (TV series), a 2009 Colombian telenovela broadcast on Caracol TV

Other uses
 Bermúdez (rum), a brand of a variety of rums from the Dominican Republic